Teacher burnout refers to a situation where an educator experiences occupational burnout, i.e. they are unable to effectively complete their professional responsibilities and tasks as a result of chronic job stress.

According to a survey done in the United Kingdom in 2012, the rate of self-reported stress, depression, and anxiety within teachers was more than double the average rates in any other profession. Some stressors that can cause teacher burnout include school climate and changes in the teaching profession. School administrators can provide relief to educators who may be experiencing mental health struggles.

Causes

School climate 
School climate is typically instilled into school systems by those in leadership roles, such as principals and superintendents. Discipline and communication between administrators and their staff heavily impact school climate. Consequently, school climate can influence teachers' engagement and dedication to their work. For example, a warm and welcoming atmosphere encourages teachers to become more involved in their job and remain at their school in the future. However, a negative atmosphere where educators are confronted with constant stressors could lead to teacher burnout and eventually leaving the job.

Changes within the profession 
"Reformation fatigue" can occur when a field of work undergoes change at a rate faster than the worker can keep up with. In the past twenty years, teachers have been confronted with both gradual and abrupt change. For example, while technology has had positive impacts on education, teachers have had to adjust to the way they deliver lessons, communicate with students, post grades, receive assignments, etc. Adjusting to these changes can cause chronic stress in educators who are unfamiliar with the equipment or digital platforms that are now essentially required to do their job.

Furthermore, the COVID-19 pandemic has necessitated abrupt changes in the field of education. Lessons that were intended for in-person classes needed to be modified for online settings and oftentimes shorter periods of time. During this process, teachers also worried about their own and their loved ones' health, had no separation of home and work life, and experienced limited social relief. In a survey about work-related anxiety in the United Kingdom, the percentage of teachers reporting high levels of stress increased from 3 percent in June 2019 to 17 percent in September 2019 for teachers who worked in private schools, and from 6 percent in June 2019 to 19 percent in September 2019 for teachers who worked in state schools. These statistics show the fluctuation of self-reported stress levels for educators during the summer months and into the beginning of the school year.

Relief 
Open discussions about mental health issues can be crucial for employees. School districts can foster a positive school climate by giving their teachers the space to openly talk about their struggles and give/receive advice for staying afloat during difficult times. Administrators can cultivate a mentally healthy culture in their schools by creating systems of support, such as periodic meetings where district leaders provide check-ins and teachers can gain social relief from their peers, or storytelling workshops where people can share their experiences. Moreover, district officials can make their faculty aware of signs of mental health struggles so that they could recognize when they or a colleague may need support.

See also 

 Occupational burnout
 Mental health in education
 School climate

References 

Teaching
Occupational stress